Neta, Nepal may refer to:

Neta, Bheri
Neta, Gandaki
Neta, Lumbini